Eutocus is a genus of skippers in the family Hesperiidae.

Species
Recognised species in the genus Eutocus include:
 Eutocus facilis (Plotz, 1884)
 Eutocus quichua Lindsey, 1925
 Eutocus vetulus (Mabille, [1883])

References

Natural History Museum Lepidoptera genus database

Hesperiinae
Hesperiidae genera